Walk witt Me is the debut studio album by American rapper and The LOX member Sheek Louch. It was released on September 16, 2003, by D-Block Records and Universal Records moving 64,000 units in its first week of release. The album gained little mainstream recognition despite being on a major label. However, the album did manage to generate a buzz for the single produced by DJ Green Lantern titled "Mighty D-Block (2 Guns Up)", which samples some lyrics of the song "Back Down" by 50 Cent. The song features fellow members Styles P and Jadakiss of D-Block, as well as ex-member J-Hood.

Track listing

Charts

References

Sheek Louch albums
2003 debut albums
Albums produced by the Alchemist (musician)
Albums produced by DJ Green Lantern
Universal Records albums